Hadmersleben is a town and a former municipality in the Börde district, in Saxony-Anhalt, Germany. Since 1 September 2010, it is part of the town of Oschersleben.

References

Towns in Saxony-Anhalt
Former municipalities in Saxony-Anhalt
Oschersleben